The World Group was the highest level of Davis Cup competition in 1985.

Sweden were the defending champions and won the title, defeating West Germany in the final, 3–2. The final was held at the Olympiahalle in Munich, West Germany, from 20 to 22 December. It was the Swedish team's second consecutive title and their 3rd Davis Cup title overall.

Participating teams

Draw

First round

Japan vs. United States

West Germany vs. Spain

Soviet Union vs. Czechoslovakia

Argentina vs. Ecuador

Paraguay vs. France

Yugoslavia vs. Australia

India vs. Italy

Chile vs. Sweden

Quarterfinals

West Germany vs. United States

Ecuador vs. Czechoslovakia

Australia vs. Paraguay

India vs. Sweden

Semifinals

West Germany vs. Czechoslovakia

Sweden vs. Australia

Final

West Germany vs. Sweden

Relegation play-offs
The first-round losers played in the Relegation Play-offs. The winners of the play-offs advanced to the 1986 Davis Cup World Group, and the losers were relegated to their respective Zonal Regions.

Results summary
Date: 4–6 October

Japan vs. Spain

Argentina vs. Soviet Union

Yugoslavia vs. France

Italy vs. Chile

References

External links
Davis Cup official website

World Group
Davis Cup World Group
Davis Cup
German